Narcisse Louis Pierre Fournier (24 November 1803 – 24 April 1880) was a French journalist, novelist and playwright.

Life 
He began his literary career aged 22 with two pieces, les Secrets de Cœur and la Poupée.  From then on he produced a large number of comedies, vaudevilles and dramas (most often in collaboration), a few novels and articles in several reviews, notably the Revue britannique.  He also translated English and German works.  His works include - un Grand Orateur (1837) ; les Suites d’une faute, 1838 ; Un roman intime; le Bonheur d’être fou ; l’Homme au masque de fer ; le Jeune Père ; un Mari qui n’a rien à faire ; les Absences de Monsieur ; Pénicaut le somnanbule ; M. Candaule ou le roi des maris, la Partie de piquet ; le Mal de la peur ; Struensée ou la reine et le favori ; À la belle étoile ; Alexis Petrovich ; Histoire d’un espion politique.

Examinateur at the Théâtre-Français and the Théâtre du Vaudeville, Fournier was a chevalier of the Légion d'honneur.

Sources 
 Société bibliographique, Revue bibliographique universelle, 2e série, t. 11, Paris, Aux bureaux du Polybiblion, 1880, p. 546

References

External links 
 

1803 births
1880 deaths
19th-century French dramatists and playwrights
Chevaliers of the Légion d'honneur
19th-century French journalists
French male journalists
19th-century French novelists
French male novelists
19th-century French male writers